The Past is a 2007 Argentine drama film directed by Héctor Babenco based on the homonymous novel by Alan Pauls.

Cast 
 Gael García Bernal as Rímini
 Analía Couceyro as Sofía
 Ana Celentano as Carmen
 Moro Anghileri as Vera
 Paulo Autran as Poussiere

References

External links 

2007 drama films
2007 films
Argentine drama films
Films directed by Héctor Babenco
2000s Argentine films